Capperia browni is a species of moth in the genus Capperia, known from Mexico. Moths in this species take flight in August, and have a wingspan of about 12.5 millimetres. The specific name refers to Dr. John Brown, who collected the species for examination.

References

Oxyptilini